Rose del Rosario Stagner, better known by her screen name Rosa del Rosario (December 15, 1917 – February 4, 2006), was a Filipino film actress of Filipino-American descent.

Early life and education
She was born to an American father (Frank H. Stagner) and a Filipino mother from Pampanga (Aquilina del Rosario). She began studying at the age of seven and was enrolled in public schools. She attended Isabelo de los Reyes Elementary School until sixth grade. She studied at the Manila High School until tenth grade. She was an average student, although her grades fluctuated from time to time. She did odd jobs at bakeshops and sold cookies, siomai and empanada at the movie theaters, which enabled her to watch movie for free.

Her film debut was at the age of fourteen when she was cast as the daughter of Carlos Padilla Sr. and Alma Bella in the horror film Satanas (1932). She starred in her first major movie Ligaw na Bulaklak (1932) opposite Rogelio de la Rosa. She held the distinction of being the first actress to play the first Filipino superheroine on screen, Darna (1951) and Darna at ang Babaing Lawin (1952). Among her memorable movies were Doktor Kuba (1933, with Patrocinio Carvajal), Minda Mora (1929) and Zamboanga (1937) both with Fernando Poe Sr., Nang Magulo ang Maynila (1937, with Domingo Principe), Himala ng Birhen sa Antipolo (1947, with Rogelio de la Rosa), Caprichosa (1947, with José Padilla Jr.), Tandang Sora (1947, with Leopoldo Salcedo), Kumander Sundang (1949, with Efren Reyes) and Rosario Cantada (1951, with Ben Perez). She also appeared in Hollywood films such as Border Bandits (1946), Anna and the King of Siam (1946, uncredited) and American Guerilla in the Philippines (1950, uncredited).

Personal life
She left the Philippines in 1956 and moved to Novato, California. She was married to John Samit and had two children named Geraldine and Terry. She was also the grandmother of two girls named Hannah and Sarah McEllistrim.

Filmography

 Satanas (1932)
 Ligaw na Bulaklak (1932)
 Tianak (1932)
 Lantang Bulaklak (1932)
 Doctor Kuba (1933)
 Ang Mga Ulila (1933)
 Mag-inang Mahirap (1934)
 Anting-Anting (1934)
 X3X (1934)
 Anak ng Bilanggo (1934)
 Sa Tawag ng Diyos (1934)
 Ang Gulong ng Buhay (1935)
 Anak ng Birhen (1935)
 Awit ng Pag-ibig (1935)
 Sumpa ng Aswang (1935)
 Buhok ni Ester (1936)
 Ama (1936)
 Ang Birheng Walang Dambana (1936)
 Gamu-Gamong Naging Lawin (1937)
 Nang Magulo ang Maynila (1937)
 Ang Kumpisalan at ang Batas (1937)
 Taong Demonyo (1937)
 Asahar at Kabaong (1937)
 Zamboanga (1937)
 Ligaw na Bituin (Filippine) (1938)
 Kalapating Puti (Filippine) (1938)
 Dalagang Silangan (Filippine) (1938)
 Biyaya ni Bathala (Filippine) (1938)
 Walang Sugat (Filippine) (1939)
 Naglahong Dambana (1939)
 Cadena de Amor (Sanggumay) (1940)
 Buenavista (1940)
 Paraiso (Excelsior) (1941)
 Ilang-Ilang (LVN) (1941)
 Ang Maestra (RDR) (1941)
 Huling Habilin (1942)
 Border Bandits (Monogram) (1946)
 Anna and the King of Siam (20th Century Fox) (1946)
 Bakya mo Neneng (Premiere) (1947)
 Si Malakas at si Maganda (1947)
 Bagong Sinderella (Premiere) (1947)
 Caprichosa (Premiere) (1947)
 Ang Himala ng Birhen sa Antipolo (LVN) (1947)
 Hagibis (Premiere) (1947)
 Hacendera (Phils Artists) (1947)
 Tandang Sora (1947)
 Bulaklak at Paruparo (Premiere) (1948)
 Anak ng Panday (Premiere) (1949)
 Kumander Sundang (Premiere) (1949)
 Bulaklak ng Digmaan (Liwayway) (1950)
 Aklat ng Pag-ibig (Balintawak) (1950)
 Kundiman ng Luha (Balintawak) (1950)
 American Guerilla in the Philippines (20th Century Fox) (1950)
 Mag-inang Ulila (Royal) (1951)
 Rosario Cantada (Royal) (1951)
 Darna (Royal) (1951)
 Singsing na Sinulid (Royal) (1951)
 Darna at ang Babaing Lawin (Royal) (1952)
 Neneng Ko (Lebran) (1952)
 May Karapatang Isilang (Deegar Cinema) (1953)
 May Bakas ang Lumipas (Ace York) (1954)

Death
Del Rosario died of pancreatic cancer on February 4, 2006, in Modesto, California at the age of 88.

External links

1917 births
2006 deaths
Actresses from Manila
Filipino child actresses
Filipino film actresses
Filipino people of American descent
Filipino emigrants to the United States
20th-century Filipino actresses